The Handball Federation of Ukraine (HFU) is the administrative and controlling body for handball and beach handball in Ukraine. Founded in 1992, HFU is a member of European Handball Federation (EHF) and the International Handball Federation (IHF).

National teams
 Ukraine men's national handball team
 Ukraine men's national junior handball team
 Ukraine women's national handball team

Competitions
 Ukrainian Men's Handball Super League
 Ukrainian Women's Handball Super League

References

External links
 Official website  
 Ukraine at the IHF website.
 Ukraine at the EHF website.

Handball in Ukraine
Handball
Collective members of the National Olympic Committee of Ukraine
Sports organizations established in 1992
1992 establishments in Ukraine
Ukraine
Ukraine
Ukraine